The Corrs – Live is an album released by the Corrs in 1997 that consists of live and acoustic performances. It was released only in Japan. However, this CD was released as a bonus disc with the Corrs' previous album, Forgiven, Not Forgotten in Australia in 1996. A different version of this album was released in Europe, with a different album cover and track listing.

Track listing

Japanese/Australian version 
"Runaway" (live)
"Secret Life" (live)
"Toss The Feathers" (instrumental)
"Forgiven, Not Forgotten" [acoustic]
"The Right Time" [acoustic]
"Rainy Day" (non-LP bonus track)
"The Right Time" [radio edit] [dance remix]

European version
"Leave Me Alone" (live)
"The Right Time" (live)
"Runaway" (live)
"Secret Life" (live)
"Someday" (live)
"Love To Love You" (live)
"Toss The Feathers" (instrumental - live)

References

The Corrs albums
1997 live albums